Stanhopea frymirei is a species of orchid endemic to Ecuador.

References

External links 

frymirei
Endemic orchids of Ecuador